Dive into Disney is a Japanese compilation cover album containing punk rock and ska renditions of various Disney songs, such as Mickey Mouse Club March, Hakuna Matata, and It's a Small World, performed by various artists.  All of the songs are recorded in English.

Track listing

2002 albums
Avex Group compilation albums
Walt Disney Records compilation albums
Covers albums